Sphingomonas vulcanisoli  is a Gram-negative, rod-shaped and non-motile bacteria from the genus of Sphingomonas which has been isolated from soil of the Gotjawal Forest in Korea.

References

Further reading 
 

vulcanisoli
Bacteria described in 2015